Yogendran Khrishnan (born 23 September 1982) is a Malaysian former badminton player and current coaching staff for Malaysia's national men's singles department.

Achievements

BWF Grand Prix (1 runner-up) 
The BWF Grand Prix had two levels, the BWF Grand Prix and Grand Prix Gold. It was a series of badminton tournaments sanctioned by the Badminton World Federation (BWF) which was held from 2007 to 2017.

Men's singles

  BWF Grand Prix Gold tournament
  BWF Grand Prix tournament

BWF International Challenge/Series (7 titles, 6 runners-up) 
Men's singles

Men's doubles

Mixed doubles

  BWF International Challenge tournament
  BWF International Series tournament
  BWF Future Series tournament

References

External links 
 

1982 births
Living people
Sportspeople from Kuala Lumpur
Malaysian people of Tamil descent
Malaysian sportspeople of Indian descent
Malaysian male badminton players
Badminton coaches
21st-century Malaysian people